The 2021 Townsville Blackhawks season was the seventh in the club's history. Coached by Aaron Payne and captained by Sam Hoare, they competed in the Intrust Super Cup.

The 2021 season marked the return of the Blackhawks after the 2020 season was cancelled after just one round due to the COVID-19 pandemic.

Season summary

Milestones
 Round 1: Tom Hancock, Patrick Kaufusi, Cameron King and Griffin Neame made their debuts for the club.
 Round 1: Griffin Neame scored his first try for the club.
 Round 3: Esan Marsters and Riley Price made their debuts for the club.
 Round 3: Josh Hoffman and Esan Marsters scored their first tries for the club.
 Round 7: Benn Campagnolo made his debut for the club.
 Round 7: Benn Campagnolo scored his first try for the club.
 Round 9: Luke Geary, Jordan Lipp, Cody Maughan and Aaron Moore made their debuts for the club.
 Round 9: Luke Geary and Moses Meninga scored their first tries for the club.
 Round 10: Patrick Kaufusi scored his first try for the club.
 Round 13: Nick Brown made his debut for the club.
 Round 13: Sam Murphy scored his first try for the club.

2021 squad

Squad movement

Gains

Losses

Fixtures

Pre-season

Regular season
Due COVID-19 lockdowns and restrictions in Queensland throughout the season, Round 12 was postponed and played after Rounds 13 and 14. Rounds 15 and 18 were cancelled and Rounds 16 and 17 were postponed and played after Round 19.

Finals

Statistics

Honours

Club
Player of the Year: Josh Chudleigh
Players' Player: Josh Chudleigh
Back of the Year: Jaelen Feeney
Forward of the Year: Josh Chudleigh
Under 20 Player of the Year: Jake Bourke
Under 19 Player of the Year: Jordii-Rae Mahendrarajah
Under 18 Player of the Year: Will Latu
Under 16 Player of the Year: Jamal Shibasaki

References

2021 in Australian rugby league
2021 in rugby league by club
Townsville Blackhawks